Master of the legend of St. Barbara (active 1470 – 1500), was an Early Netherlandish painter.

Biography
He was active in Brussels, but has been considered to possibly be the same person as Aert van den Bossche because he signed into the Bruges Guild of St. Luke as 'Harnoult van den Boske' in 1505.

Max J. Friedländer identified several works by this master, not all of which have been reattributed to Aert van den Bossche.

References

Master of the legend of St. Barbara on Artnet

1470 births
1500 deaths
Early Netherlandish painters
Artists from Brussels
Legend of St. Barbara